Petra Píchalová Langrová (born 27 June 1970) is a retired tennis player from Czechoslovakia and later Czech Republic.

Langrová gained professional status in 1986. She won one singles title and five double titles in her career on the WTA Tour. She reached career-high rankings of 53 in singles (in May 1997) and 35 in doubles (in April 1993), and retired from the tour in 1998.

WTA Tour finals

Singles: 2 (1 title, 1 runner-up)

Doubles: 10 (5 titles, 5 runners-up)

ITF Circuit finals

Singles (3–2)

Doubles (8–6)

External links
 
 
 

Czech female tennis players
Czechoslovak female tennis players
Sportspeople from Prostějov
1970 births
Living people